Caryocolum mongolense is a moth of the family Gelechiidae. It is found in Mongolia.

The length of the forewings is 7.5–8 mm. The forewings are dark grey-brown without markings. Adults have been recorded on wing in late August.

References

Moths described in 1969
mongolense
Moths of Asia